The Silence Twister is a German ultralight designed  by Silence Aircraft for amateur construction, either from plans or kits.  The prototype first flew on 30 September 2000.

Design and development
The Twister is a single-seat low-wing monoplane with elliptical wings and tailplane. It has a retractable conventional landing gear with a fixed tailwheel. The design drew inspiration from the Supermarine Spitfire, and the shapes of the Twister's wings, fin and tailplane all recall the famous World War II fighter. This compact rotary motor allowed a sleek engine cowling, but the engine was rejected and production aircraft use  Jabiru 2200 or 
ULPower UL260i engines.

An electric aircraft version was under development in 2010.

Propeller
The Twister prototype was fitted with Silence Aircraft's own automatic variable-pitch propeller called the "VProp".  The LAA have yet to allow the VProp to be fitted on UK aircraft, so UK Twisters have fixed-blade propellers instead.

Operational history
Twenty-one examples had been completed and flown by December 2011.

Variants
SA155 Initial prototype powered by a  MidWest AE50 Wankel rotary engine. The second prototype was powered by a  Diamond AE50 engine.
SA180 powered by a  Jabiru 2200 engine.
Akron A version developed for the US market under Experimental aircraft certification rules.

Specifications (Prototype)

See also
Flight Team Twister, a different aircraft with the same model name

References

External links

2000s German civil utility aircraft
Homebuilt aircraft
Single-engined tractor aircraft
Low-wing aircraft
Aircraft first flown in 2000